The Lord Fellowes can refer to:

 Robert Fellowes, Baron Fellowes
 Julian Fellowes, Baron Fellowes of West Stafford